The 1994 Massachusetts Marauders season was the seventh season for the Maruaders, and the first for the franchise in Massachusetts. They finished 8-4 and were defeated in the semifinals.

Regular season

Schedule

Standings

z – clinched homefield advantage

y – clinched division title

x – clinched playoff spot

Playoffs

Roster

Awards

1994 Arena Football League season
1994 in sports in Massachusetts
Massachusetts Marauders